Steinbach is a German surname. Notable people with the surname include:

Debbie Steinbach (born 1953), American golfer
Eckehard Steinbach, German engineer
Emil Steinbach (1846–1907), Austrian statesman
Eric Steinbach (born 1980), American football player
Erika Steinbach (born 1943), German politician
Erwin von Steinbach (1244–1318), German architect of the Muenster of Strasbourg
Fritz Steinbach (1855–1916), German composer
Haim Steinbach (born 1944), American artist
Klaus Steinbach (born 1953), German swimmer
Larry Steinbach (1900–1967), American football player
Laura Steinbach (born 1985), German handball player
Michael Steinbach (born 1969), retired German rower
Settela Steinbach (1934–1944), Dutch holocaust victim
Terry Steinbach (born 1962), retired American baseball player
Wolfgang Steinbach (born 1954), former German football player and manager

See also
Steinbach (disambiguation)

German-language surnames